Sophie Harding (born 6 June 1999) is an Australian soccer player who plays for Western Sydney Wanderers. She has previously played for Newcastle Jets.

Early life

Harding was born in England before immigrating to Sydney, Australia at the age of six. She played youth football for Harbord Seasiders United, Brookvale, and Manly United. Harding began playing for Manly's U'13 team and progressed to the first team who she represented for three years.

Club career

Harding made her National Premier Leagues NSW Women's debut for Manly United in 2015. After breaking through with Manly she joined fellow NSW NPLW side North West Sydney Koalas in 2019, Harding  has scored 19 goals in 44 appearances across three seasons with NWS Koalas.

Harding was signed by A-League Women club Newcastle Jets ahead of the 2020–21 season. She played 11 of the Jets 12 matches and was noted for her pace. The young forward scored her first goal for Newcastle in a 5–1 win over Wellington Phoenix on Matchday 2 of the 2021–22 season, after re-signing for the season. In September 2022, the club announced she had departed, and two months later she signed a two-year contract with Western Sydney Wanderers.

Career statistics

References

1999 births
Newcastle Jets FC (A-League Women) players
Western Sydney Wanderers FC (A-League Women) players
Manly United FC players
Living people
Women's association footballers not categorized by position
Australian women's soccer players
English women's footballers
English emigrants to Australia